Choniolaimidae is a family of nematodes belonging to the order Desmodorida.

Genera:
 Choniolaimus Ditlevsen, 1918
 Cobbionema Filipjev, 1922
 Gammanema Cobb, 1920
 Halichoanolaimus de Man, 1886
 Latronema Wieser, 1954
 Nunema N.Cobb, 1933
 Pseudonchus Cobb, 1920

References

Nematode families